Templemore is a town in County Tipperary, Ireland.

Templemore may also refer to:
 Garda Síochána College in the town, the training college for the Irish police, sometimes referred to as "Templemore"
 Templemore railway station in the town
 Baron Templemore, County Donegal, a title in the peerage of the United Kingdom
 Templemore Cathedral, a destroyed medieval cathedral in Derry, Northern Ireland
 Templemore, a parish of County Londonderry, Northern Ireland